Sun Ra and his Solar Arkestra Visits Planet Earth is a jazz album by the American musician Sun Ra and his Solar Arkestra. Recorded between late 1956 and 1958, the album was originally released on Ra's own Saturn label in 1966, and was reissued on CD by Evidence in 1992. In keeping with many Saturn releases, one side features cuts from the arkestra c.1958, whilst the other side comes from the 1956 sessions originally intended for Sound of Joy but still unreleased in 1966.

Track listing

12" Vinyl
All songs by Sun Ra unless otherwise noted;
Side A:
"Planet Earth" - (4.54)
"Eve" - (5.35)
"Overtones of China" - (4.21)
Side B:
"Reflections in Blue" - (5.55)
"Two Tones" (Patrick, Davis) - (3.36)
"El Viktor" - (2.28)
"Saturn" - (3.55)

The sides were switched for the Evidence reissue, as well as being coupled with the album Interstellar Low Ways.

Musicians
On Reflections In Blue, Two Tones, El Viktor and Saturn, recorded at the Balkan Studio, Chicago, November 1, 1956;
Sun Ra - Piano, Wurlitzer electric piano
Art Hoyle - Trumpet
John Avant or Julian Priester - Trombone
Pat Patrick - Alto sax, tenor sax
John Gilmore - Tenor sax
Charles Davis - Baritone sax
Victor Sproles - Bass
William Cochran - Drums
Jim Herndon - Tympani, timbales

On Planet Earth, Eve and Overtones of China recorded at Rehearsals, late 1957 or 1958;
Sun Ra - Wurlitzer Electric Piano, Piano, Percussion
Lucious Randolph - Trumpet
Nate Pryor - Trombone
James Spaulding - Alto Sax
Marshall Allen - Alto Sax, Flute
John Gilmore - Tenor Sax, Percussion
Pat Patrick - Baritone Sax, Alto Sax, 'Space Lute', Percussion
Charles Davis - Baritone Sax
Ronnie Boykins - Bass
Robert Barry - Drums
Jim Herndon - Tympani

See also 
Sun Ra Discography

References

External links 
Complete Sun Ra's Discography

Sun Ra albums
1958 albums
El Saturn Records albums
Evidence Music albums